The moon forest shrew (Sylvisorex lunaris) is a species of mammal in the family Soricidae. It is found in Burundi, Rwanda, and Uganda. Its natural habitat is subtropical or tropical moist montane forests.

References

Sylvisorex
Taxonomy articles created by Polbot
Mammals described in 1906
Taxa named by Oldfield Thomas